Devonshire Community Public School is an elementary school in Ottawa, Ontario, Canada; in the Ottawa-Carleton District School Board (OCDSB). Located at 100 Breezehill Avenue North, the school provides single-track Early French Immersion (EFI) programming for the surrounding Hintonburg, Mechanicsville, Centretown, Lebreton Flats and Civic Hospital neighbourhoods. Their mission is to provide each child with the opportunity to achieve his or her potential and become fluent in a second language.

References 

 City of Ottawa Report: Designation of Devonshire Public School (12 June 2008)
 Cummings, H.R. and W.T. MacSkimming. The City of Ottawa Public Schools: A brief History. Ottawa, ON: The Ottawa Board of Education, 1971.
 The Evening Citizen (Ottawa), June 16, 1921. Page 3. "Devonshire School Is Opened by Governor General, Praise of Our System of Education"
 The Evening Citizen (Ottawa), June 20, 1931. "Closing Exercises of Sunshire Class"
 The Evening Citizen (Ottawa), March 1, 1947. Page 11. "Devonshire School Has Fine Background"
 The Ottawa Citizen, June 3, 1970.  Page 55. "Devonshire hits 60"

External links 
 http://www.ocdsb.ca/
 http://www.devonshireps.ocdsb.ca/
 http://www.ottawa.ca/
http://www.hintonburg.ca/

Elementary schools in Ottawa
French immersion schools in Canada
Educational institutions established in 1910
1910 establishments in Ontario
Designated heritage properties in Ottawa